Aspasia lunata is a species of orchid, native to tropical South America, in the Brazilian southeast and south and reaching Bolivia and Paraguay, from  in elevation.

Description 
It forms large colonies, however, being not a particularly common species, it is just occasionally found, mostly on areas of transition between shady forest and open areas both in rain forests and cloud montane forests.

Aspasia lunata is primarily an epiphyte on thick stems but often is found living over rock grooves covered by fallen leaves and humid forests where they never are exposed to direct-straight sunlight.

References

External links 

lunata
Orchids of Bolivia
Orchids of Brazil
Flora of Paraguay
Epiphytic orchids
Plants described in 1836